Chad Everett Dukes (born December 29, 1971) is a former American football running back in the National Football League for the Washington Redskins (1998–2000), San Diego Chargers (1998), St. Louis Rams (2000) and the Jacksonville Jaguars (2000) and played four games total in his NFL career (two for Jaguars, two for Skins).  He played college football at the University of Pittsburgh.  Dukes played on the Albany Firebirds (1998–1999) before his NFL career, the Colorado Crush (2004), the Manchester Wolves (2002–2003) and the Philadelphia Soul after his NFL career in the Arena Football League.  Dukes won AFL Ironman of the year in 1998 when he was with the Firebirds.  In 2004, he was a part of the 2004 Crush ArenaBowl XIX Championship team.  In 2002, Dukes was named the defensive af2 Tough Man of the Year while playing for the Manchester Wolves in 2002.

External links
arenafootball.com bio page

1971 births
Living people
Sportspeople from Albany, New York
Players of American football from New York (state)
American football running backs
Pittsburgh Panthers football players
Albany Firebirds players
Washington Redskins players
Jacksonville Jaguars players
Los Angeles Avengers players
Colorado Crush players
Philadelphia Soul players
Austin Wranglers players
Manchester Wolves players